The Competition Commission of Pakistan (CCP), formerly Monopoly Control Authority, is an independent agency quasi-regulatory, quasi-judicial body of the Government of Pakistan for the enforcement of economic competition laws in Pakistan that helps ensure healthy competition. It was created in 2007 by the President of Pakistan through the promulgation of the Competition Ordinance, 2007 replacing Monopoly Control Authority, later Parliament of Pakistan passed Competition Act, 2010 to give legal cover and powers to the commission.

History 
The Competition Commission of Pakistan (CCP) was established on 2 October 2007 under the Competition Ordinance, 2007, which was repromulgated in November 2009.
Prior to the Competition Ordinance, 2007, Pakistan had an anti-monopoly law namely ‘Monopolies and Restrictive Trade Practices (Control and Prevention) Ordinance’ (MRTPO) 1970. The Monopoly Control Authority (MCA) was the organization to administer this Law.

References

External links
 CCP official website

2007 establishments in Pakistan
Government agencies established in 2007
Pakistan
Consumer organisations in Pakistan
Financial regulatory authorities of Pakistan